Microscelis is a former genus of bulbuls.

The following species were classified within the genus Microscelis but are now assigned to Iole, Hemixos or Hypsipetes:

 Olive bulbul (as Microscelis viridescens)
 Buff-vented bulbul (as Microscelis charlottae)
 Ashy bulbul (as Microscelis flavala)
 Brown-eared bulbul (as Microscelis amaurotis)
 Black bulbul (as Microscelis leucocephalus)
 Black bulbul (psaroides) (as Microscelis psaroides)

References

Bird genera
Obsolete bird taxa
Taxa named by George Robert Gray